Iceboro is a village in the town of Richmond in Sagadahoc County, Maine, United States.  The village is located at an altitude of 135 feet (41 m). The community had a post office from 1882 to 1905.

References

Villages in Maine
Villages in Sagadahoc County, Maine